Ocros is a village in central Peru, capital of the Ocros District.

References

Populated places in the Ancash Region